Hymenobacter pedocola is a Gram-negative and aerobic bacterium from the genus of Hymenobacter which has been isolated from soil from Gyeongsangnam-do in Korea.

References 

pedocola
Bacteria described in 2018